Marina Kalaitzieva (born January 24, 1979, in Bulgaria) is a Greek-Bulgarian female professional volleyball player who has been a member of the Greece women's national volleyball team.

At club level, she played most notably for Greek powerhouse Olympiacos Piraeus (2007–2009), with whom she reached the quarter-finals of the 2007-2008 CEV Women's Challenge Cup.

References

External links
 profile at greekvolley.gr 
 profile at CEV at cev.lu

Olympiacos Women's Volleyball players
Greek women's volleyball players
1979 births
Living people